Machaerium nyctitans, also known as canela do brejo  or espuela de gallo, is a  tree species in the family Fabaceae, native to Brazil and  Argentina.

References

nyctitans
Flora of Argentina
Flora of Brazil
Flora of the Atlantic Forest
Trees of Argentina
Trees of Brazil
Taxa named by George Bentham